Hafshejan (also Romanized as Hafshejān and Hafeshjān; also known as Hosheh Gūn, Hushegūn, and Jasteh Jūn) is a city in the Central District of Shahrekord County, Chaharmahal and Bakhtiari province, Iran. At the 2006 census, its population was 20,042 in 5,171 households. The following census in 2011 counted 20,847 people in 6,062 households. The latest census in 2016 showed a population of 21,352 people in 6,655 households. The city is populated by Persians.

Hafshejan has existed for around 9000 years.

Geography 

One of the most well-known places in Hafshejan is a spring called Cheshme Zane; the name means eyes of birth or eyes at birth - implying a new and beautiful site to behold.

Zaneh Hafshejan fountain walkway
Hafshejan walkway is in the Jahanbin mountain range and is located 2 km from Hafshejan and 20 km from Shahr-e Kord. On Nature Day each year, more than 10 thousand people visit the park fountain.

A walkway extends from the main Tourist attraction near the current centre of Chaharmahal and Bakhtiari Province, Shahr-e Kord.

Water is routed from the fountain to the agricultural plains 20 kilometres south of Branch and north of the mountain barrier between the world and 3 km from the city. The earthen dam has a clay core, and the reservoir has a volume of 1.3 million cubic meters. The dam crest's length is 410 m and the crest's width is 8 m, with a height of 42 meters in the deepest area.

Elamite brick

The Hafshejan Elamite brick carries the ancient scrolls of Chaharmahal and Bakhtiari Province. After the inscription is written Hafshejan. This brick has a width of 15 cm, a diameter of 8 cm, and has 26 lines. It was created more than 3100 years ago (1120 BC. M.). The brick was discovered in the province of Chaharmahal and Bakhtiari Province in the afternoon Elamite shows

Gallery

See also
 Mount Jahanbin
 Hushang

References 

Shahrekord County

Cities in Chaharmahal and Bakhtiari Province

Populated places in Chaharmahal and Bakhtiari Province

Populated places in Shahr-e Kord County